Kasalan (also Romanized as Kasalān) is a village in Tirchai Rural District, Kandovan District, Meyaneh County, East Azerbaijan Province, Iran. At the 2006 census, its population was 209, in 59 families.

References 

Populated places in Meyaneh County